Royal is an unincorporated community in Garland County, Arkansas, United States.  It lies at an elevation of 489 feet (149 m). Royal is also the home to the only bronze foundry in Arkansas, Light and Time Design Studios.

References

Unincorporated communities in Garland County, Arkansas
Unincorporated communities in Arkansas